Ed Caraeff (born April 18, 1950) is an American photographer, illustrator and graphic designer, who has worked largely in the music industry.

He has art directed, photographed and designed more than 400 record album covers from 1967 to 1981 for numerous artists, including Bee Gees, Elton John, Steely Dan, Carly Simon, Three Dog Night, Tom Waits and Dolly Parton. His photography has appeared on the cover of four issues of Rolling Stone Magazine and is included in the permanent collection of The Rock and Roll Hall of Fame.

Caraeff's photograph of Jimi Hendrix at the Monterey Pop Festival has been reproduced in articles and was included in the book Burning Desire: The Jimi Hendrix Experience Through The Lens of Ed Caraeff.

Career

Caraeff's photographs are inducted in the Rock and Roll Hall of Fame and have been used by many different media and ads, including album covers, TV, Magazines, Radio posters, Promotional Posters, and merchandise. He has also created album covers and photographs for the Bee Gees, Elton John, Dolly Parton, Little Richard, Jim Morrison, Neil Diamond, Barry Manilow, Hall & Oates, Dwight Twilley, Tom Petty & the Heartbreakers, Cheech & Chong, Steely Dan, Marvin Gaye, Carly Simon, Tim Buckley, Jose Feliciano, and more than five hundred more.

In 1979, Ed Caraeff was called by Robert Stigwood for the 4th time to shoot the consummation Bee Gees-era album cover Spirits Having Flown which was promoted by the "Spirits Having Flown Tour '79".

Caraeff stepped away from his camera in 1981 with the Private Eyes album by Hall & Oates to pursue his next dream of becoming a chef. In 1987 Rolling Stone magazine asked him for permission to use a forgotten picture of Jimi Hendrix as a magazine cover.

References

Living people
American photographers
Album-cover and concert-poster artists
1950 births
20th-century American photographers